Paul Fahy is the current Artistic Director of the Galway Arts Festival.

A native of County Galway, he has faced some criticism over ticket prices in recent years but replied it was necessary to cover the costs of paying performers and ensuring the high quality of the festival.

References

People from County Galway
People from Vesoul
Living people
Irish theatre managers and producers
Year of birth missing (living people)